Marie Petiet or Marie Dujardin-Beaumetz (1854–1893) was a French painter known for her genre scenes and portraits.

Biography
Dujardin-Beaumetz née Petiet was born on 20 July 1854 in Limoux, France the daughter of the painter Léopold Petiet. She studied with the painter Jean-Jacques Henner from 1877 through 1883. 

She married the painter  1886 and began showing her work under the name Marie Dujardin-Beaumetz.

She  exhibited at the Société des Artistes Français from 1877 through 1883. She also exhibited at the Paris Salon.

Petiet died on 16 April 1893 in Paris.

Legacy
Her works are preserved in the Musée Petiet de Limoux. Her work Knitter asleep was included in the book Women Painters of the World. Petiet was included in the 2018 exhibit Women in Paris 1850-1900.

References

External links

More works by Petiet at the Kaizen Gallery

1854 births
1893 deaths
People from Limoux
French women painters
19th-century French women artists